Caricatures is an album by American trumpeter Donald Byrd recorded and released on the Blue Note label in 1976. It was Byrd's final album for the label and his fifth straight release produced by Larry Mizell.

Reception 
The AllMusic review by Rob Theakston awarded the album 3 stars and stated "Caricatures serves its primary purpose of being a jazz fusion record to make both people dance and purists wince at the notion that jazz can fuse with other elements and achieve success".

Track listing 
All compositions by Larry Mizell Byrd except as indicated
 "Dance Band" (Larry Mizell, Fonce Mizell) - 6:13  
 "Wild Life" (Mizell, Mizell) - 5:59  
 "Caricatures" - 5:10  
 "Science Funktion" (Mizell, Mizell)  4:50  
 "Dancing in the Street" (Marvin Gaye, Ivy Jo Hunter, William "Mickey" Stevenson) - 4:43  
 "Return of the King" (Mizell, Mizell) - 4:51  
 "Onward 'Til Morning" - 3:47  
 "Tell Me" (Donald Byrd, Larry Mizell) - 4:20  
Recorded at The Sound Factory, Los Angeles, California in April–May, 1976

Personnel 
 Donald Byrd - trumpet, flugelhorn, vocals 
 Oscar Brashear - trumpet
 George Bohanon - trombone
 Gary Bartz, Ernie Watts - saxophones
 Jerry Peters, Patrice Rushen, Skip Scarborough - keyboards
 Fonce Mizell - keyboards, trumpet, backing vocals
 John Rowin, Bernard Beloyd Taylor, David T. Walker - guitar
 Scott Edwards (tracks 2-8), James Jamerson (track 1) - electric bass
 Alphonse Mouzon (tracks 1-5), Harvey Mason (track 1) - drums
 Mayuto Correa, Stephanie Spruill - percussion
 Mildred Lane (tracks 2 & 5), Kay Haith (tracks 3 & 7) - lead vocals
 Theresa Mitchell, Vernessa Mitchell, Larry Mizell - backing vocals
 Wade Marcus - string arrangement
Unidentified strings

References 

Blue Note Records albums
Donald Byrd albums
1976 albums
Albums produced by the Mizell Brothers